Edward Jones was an English football manager, who coached the Egyptian national side between 1949 and 1952. Jones was in charge of Egypt at the 1952 Summer Olympics.

References

Year of birth missing
Year of death missing
English expatriate football managers
English football managers
English expatriate sportspeople in Egypt
Expatriate football managers in Egypt
Egypt national football team managers